Spooner is an English surname of either Anglo-Saxon or Anglo-Danish origin (Spøner). It may refer to:

People
 Arthur Spooner (painter) (1873–1962), English painter
 Bathsheba Spooner (1746–1778), the first woman to be executed in the United States by Americans
 Bill Spooner (politician) (1897–1966), Australian politician
 Charles Edwin Spooner (1853–1909), British engineer
 David Brainard Spooner (1879–1925), American archeologist and linguist
 Dennis Spooner (1932–1986), English television screenwriter and story editor
 Dick Spooner (1919–1997), cricketer
 Doreen Spooner (1928–2019), English newspaper photographer
 Eric Spooner (1891–1952), Australian politician
 Ernest John Spooner (1887–1942), Rear-Admiral Malaya, commander of UK Naval forces in Singapore
 Frank Spooner (born 1937), Louisiana Republican politician
 George Spooner (1893–1975), New Zealand politician
 Henry J. Spooner (1839–1918), Rhode Island Congressman
 James Spooner, film director
 John Coit Spooner (1843–1919), U.S. Senator and lawyer from Wisconsin
 Karl Spooner (1931–1984), Major League Baseball pitcher with the Brooklyn Dodgers
 Lloyd Spooner (1884–1966), American sports shooter and Olympic champion
 Lysander Spooner (1808–1887), American individualist anarchist
 Natalie Spooner (born 1990), Canadian ice hockey player
 Nicky Spooner (born 1971), English footballer
 Paul Spooner (1746–1789), Vermont Lieutenant Governor and Vermont Supreme Court justice 
 Philip Loring Spooner (1879–1945), American tenor
 Philip L. Spooner Jr. (1847–1918), American businessman and politician in Wisconsin.
 Reggie Spooner (1880–1961), English cricketer
 Richard Spooner (MP) (1783–1864), British Member of Parliament and businessman
 Richard Spooner (equestrian), American show jumping rider
 Richard T. Spooner (born 1925), former United States Marine Corps officer
 Richard Spooner (MP), (1783–1864), MP and ecclesiastical writer
 Ryan Spooner (born 1992), Canadian ice hockey player
 Stanley Spooner (1856–1940), English journalist and editor. Creator of Flight magazine.  
 Wilf Spooner, Canadian politician of the 1950s and 1960s
 William Archibald Spooner (1844-1930), English clergyman and scholar, after whom spoonerisms are named
 Winifred Spooner (1900-1933), English aviator
 Wyman Spooner (1795–1877), Wisconsin politician and Lieutenant Governor
 The Spooners of Porthmadog, a family of railway engineers, among them Charles Edwin Spooner

Fictional characters 
 Arthur Spooner, on the television show The King of Queens
 Bert Spooner, on the television show Are You Being Served?
 Del Spooner, hero of the 2004 film I, Robot
 Jim Spooner, on the television show Swift and Shift Couriers

English-language surnames